¿Dónde Están Mis Amigos? is the fourth studio album by Spanish hard rock band Extremoduro. It was produced by Ventura Rico, recorded and published by Dro Records in 1993. The album was recorded in autumn 1993 and was published later that year. While all his works hitherto had been self-produced, this is the first record for which they hired a professional producer: Ventura Rico. This LP is considered the most personal and intimate of the band.

Track listing
All songs written by Roberto Iniesta.

2011 edition bonus tracks

Personnel 
Extremoduro
 Robe Iniesta – Vocals, backing vocals, guitar, flute and reed
 Eugenio Ortiz "UGE" – Guitar
 Jorge "el Moja" – Drums
 Miguel Ferreras – Bass
 Ramón "Mon" Sogas – Bass
Additional personnel
 Belén – Vocals on No me calientes que me hundo, Pepe Botika, Estoy muy bien, Bribriblibli
 Fernando Madina – Vocals on No me calientes que me hundo, Pepe Botika, Bribriblibli and Malos pensamientos
 Aitor Bengoa – Vocals on No me calientes que me hundo
 Selu – Saxophone and reed
 Iñaki "Uoho" Antón – Guitar on Los tengo todos

Certifications

References

External links 
 Extremoduro official website (in Spanish)

1993 albums
Extremoduro albums
Spanish-language albums